The Jaya Group of Colleges consists of more than 20 education institutions including two higher secondary schools and seven professional course institutions in the suburbs of Thiruninravur, Chennai, Tamil Nadu, India. The colleges are run by a trust named Jaya Education Trust. The trust was founded in 1977 and expanded into a chain of minority run establishments.  The school caters to the needs of students in and around Thiruninravur, a majority of whom are socially and economically disadvantaged.

Institutions

The campuses of the group include:

 SVS Medical, Dental & Nursing College
 Ragas Dental College & Gen.Hospital
 Jaya Engineering College
 Jaya College of Engineering & Technology
 Jaya Institute of Technology
 Jaya Sakthi Engineering College
 Jaya College of Arts & Science
 Jaya - Arakkonam Arts & Science
 Jaya College of Education
 Jaya Polytechnic College
 Ragas School of Nursing
 Jaya College of Pharmacy
 National College of Pharmacy
 Jaya College of Physiotheraphy
 Balalok Matriculation Hr. Sec. School
 Jaya Matriculation Hr. Sec. School
 Sri Sathya Sai Matriculation School
 Jaya Public School

Courses
The group offers undergraduate and postgraduate courses in Electronics and Communications, EEE, Information Technology,  Computing, Engineering, Textile technology, Biotechnology, Dentistry, Pharmacy, Biochemistry, Microbiology, Mathematics, Commerce and Business studies. PhD research course is also offered for Dentistry in Ragas Dental College campus.

International connections
The group was the first international chapter of the Sigma Iota Epsilon (SIE) outside United States.

The group has a MoU with Korea's oldest University, Chonbuk National University, which includes collaborative teaching, training and student exchanges. A similar MoU exists with Danish Koge Business School.

References

External links

Universities and colleges in Chennai
Colleges affiliated to University of Madras